Miloš Orbović (born 2 November 1993) is a Serbian handball player who plays for Motor Zaporizhzhia and the Serbia national team.

Club career
Orbović started out at Vrbas. He later spent three seasons with Vojvodina (2014–2017), winning three consecutive championships.

International career
A full Serbia international since 2015, Orbović made his major debut for the national team at the 2016 European Championship.

Honours
Vojvodina
 Serbian Handball Super League: 2014–15, 2015–16, 2016–17
 Serbian Handball Cup: 2014–15
 Serbian Handball Super Cup: 2014, 2015, 2016
Politehnica Timișoara
 Cupa României: 2018–19

References

External links
 SEHA record
 

1993 births
Living people
People from Vrbas, Serbia
Serbian male handball players
RK Vrbas players
RK Vojvodina players
HC Motor Zaporizhia players
Liga ASOBAL players
Expatriate handball players
Serbian expatriate sportspeople in Romania
Serbian expatriate sportspeople in Spain
Serbian expatriate sportspeople in Ukraine